Nicholas Mann may refer to:

 Nicholas Mann (occult writer) (born 1952), author of books on geomancy, mythology, etc.
 Nicholas Mann (antiquarian) (died 1753), English antiquary and Master of the Charterhouse
 Nicholas Mann (academic) (born 1942), scholar of Italian humanism